Lothair (Latin: Lotharius; German: Lothar; French: Lothaire) is a Germanic given name, derived from the older form Clotaire (Chlotharius).

People 

Lothair I (795–855), King of Italy and Holy Roman Emperor
Lothair I, Margrave of the Nordmark (940–1003)
Lothair II of Lotharingia (825–869), a king, son of Emperor Lothair I
Lothair II of Italy (died 950), a king
Lothair III, Holy Roman Emperor (1075–1137), also called Lothair II
Lothair of France (941–986), sometimes called Lothair II
Lothair the Lame (died 865), Abbot of Saint-Germain-des-Prés
Lothair Udo I, Count of Stade (950–994)
Lothair Udo I, Margrave of the Nordmark (994–1057)
Lothair Udo II, Margrave of the Nordmark (1025–1082)
Lothair Udo III, Margrave of the Nordmark (1070–1106)

Other uses 
Lothair, Georgia, in the United States
Lothair, Montana, in the United States
Lothair, Kentucky, in the United States
Lothair, South Africa, a town in Mpumalanga
Lothair (novel), by Benjamin Disraeli
Lothair (clipper), a ship built in Britain in 1870
M. Lothaire, pseudonym of a group of mathematicians
Cross of Lothair
Lothair Crystal

See also
 Lothar
 Lothaire
 Luther (disambiguation)
 Chlothar